Mark or Marc Stevens or Stephens may refer to:

Mark Stevens (actor) (1916–1994), American actor
Mark Stevens (gridiron football) (born 1962), American and Canadian football player
Mark Stevens (footballer) (born 1975), Australian-rules footballer
Marc Stevens (actor) (1943–1989), American erotic performer
Mark Stevens (art critic), New York magazine art critic, author, and 2005 Pulitzer Prize winner
Mark Stevens (film editor), American film editor
Mark Stevens (venture capitalist) (born 1960), venture capitalist at S-Cubed Capital
Mark Stephens (solicitor) (born 1957), British media & human rights lawyer, mediator & broadcaster
Marc Stevens (fighter), American mixed martial arts fighter
Robert X. Cringely (born 1953), pen name of technology journalist Mark Stephens
Mark Stevens (cricketer) (born 1959), former English cricketer
Marc Stevens (cryptology) (born 1981), cryptology researcher, author of HashClash
Mark Stevens (attorney), criminal defense lawyer in Salem, New Hampshire
Mark Stevens (swimmer) (born 1975), English swimmer
Mark Stevens (singer), Australian singer, songwriter and worship leader
Mark Stevens, keyboard player with Mankind